Halicryptus is the sole genus of its class of priapulid worms, and grows to great size.   It has an important effect on the structure of soft-sediment communities.

This genus contains the following species:
 Halicryptus higginsi
 Halicryptus spinulosus - type species

See also

References

External links

Priapulida
Ecdysozoa genera